Synové a dcery Jakuba skláře was a Czechoslovak television programme which aired in 1986. The programme was directed by Jaroslav Dudek. The series depicts the fate of the glass-making family of Jakub Cirkl between the years of 1899 and 1957. In the life stories of the multi-member family dynasty, it was possible to uniquely capture the realities of the time and the characters of the individual characters. In 2011, it was announced that the programme, along with 17 others, would be released on DVD within the following three years.

References

External links 
 CSFD.cz - Synové a dcery Jakuba skláře
 

Czechoslovak television series
1986 Czechoslovak television series debuts
Czech drama television series
1980s Czechoslovak television series
Television series about Czech resistance to Nazi occupation
Czechoslovak Television original programming